Zang Wenbo (born June 19, 1996) is a Chinese figure skater. He competed at the 2010 World Junior Championships in The Hague, Netherlands and the 2014 World Junior Championships in Sofia, Bulgaria. At both events, he qualified for the free skate and finished 17th overall.

Programs

Competitive highlights 
JGP: Junior Grand Prix

References

External links 
 

1996 births
Chinese male single skaters
Living people
Sportspeople from Qiqihar
Figure skaters from Heilongjiang